Liu Sue-Hua, also known as Leanne Liu, is a Golden Bell Award-winning Hong Kong actress.

She first starred in Shaw Brothers films in Hong Kong, but moved to Taiwan in the 1980s to focus on her television career. She is particularly famous for appearing in many television adaptations of Chiung Yao's novels. She is still active in Mainland Chinese series and is one of the highest paid television actresses there.

Filmography

Films

Television

References

External links

1959 births
Living people
Hong Kong television actresses
Hong Kong film actresses
Actresses from Beijing
20th-century Chinese actresses
21st-century Chinese actresses
20th-century Hong Kong actresses
21st-century Hong Kong actresses
Chinese film actresses
Chinese television actresses